Ramnogaster is a small genus of sprats found only in South America.  Two species are placed in this genus:
 R. arcuata (Jenyns, 1842) (Jenyns's sprat)
 R. melanostoma (C. H. Eigenmann, 1907) (Uruguay river sprat)

References
 

Clupeidae
Fish of South America
Freshwater fish genera